Columbite, also called niobite, niobite-tantalite and columbate, of general chemical formula , is a black mineral group that is an ore of niobium. It has a submetallic luster and a high density and is a niobate of iron and manganese. This mineral group was first found in Haddam, Connecticut, in the United States. It forms a series with the tantalum-dominant analogue ferrotantalite and one with the manganese-dominant analogue manganocolumbite. The iron-rich member of the columbite group is ferrocolumbite. Some tin and tungsten may be present in the mineral. Yttrocolumbite is the yttrium-rich columbite with the formula . It is a radioactive mineral found in Mozambique.

Columbite has the same composition and crystal symmetry (orthorhombic) as tantalite. In fact, the two are often grouped together as a semi-singular mineral series called columbite-tantalite or coltan in many mineral guides. However, tantalite has a much greater specific gravity than columbite, more than 8.0 compared to columbite's 5.2.

Columbite is also very similar to tapiolite. Those minerals have the same chemical composition but different crystal symmetry: orthorhombic for columbite and tetragonal for tapiolite.

Columbite contains varying amounts of thorium and uranium, which makes it radioactive to various degrees.

History and etymology 
The occurrence of columbite in the United States was made known from a specimen presumably stemming from John Winthrop (1606–1676), first Governor of the Connecticut Colony and avid mineral collector. Amidst 600 other samples, it was donated by his namesake and grandson, John Winthrop (1681–1747) to Hans Sloane, President of the Royal Society of London, upon becoming a Fellow of the Royal Society in 1737.

In 1801, Charles Hatchett discovered the element niobium in this specimen, which he named columbium in honour of explorer Christopher Columbus.

See also
 Coltan
 List of minerals

References

External links 

 

Iron(II) minerals
Manganese(II) minerals
Niobium minerals
Orthorhombic minerals
Minerals in space group 60
Oxide minerals
Tantalum minerals